Mingshui County is a county of Heilongjiang Province, China.  It is under the jurisdiction of the prefecture-level city of Suihua.  Its population was 336,649 in 1999.

Administrative divisions 
Mingshui County is divided into 4 subdistricts, 6 towns and 6 townships. 
4 subdistricts
 Mingyang, Mingyuan, Mingxin, Mingquan
6 towns
 Mingshui, Xingren, Yongxing, Chongde, Tongda, Shuangxing
6 townships
 Yongjiu, Shuren, Guangrong, Fanrong, Tongquan, Yulin

Climate

Notes and references 

 
County level divisions of Heilongjiang
Suihua